Sodium ions are necessary in small amounts for some types of plants, but sodium as a nutrient is more generally needed in larger amounts by animals, due to their use of it for generation of nerve impulses and for maintenance of electrolyte balance and fluid balance. In animals, sodium ions are necessary for the aforementioned functions and for heart activity and certain metabolic functions. The health effects of salt reflect what happens when the body has too much or too little sodium.
Characteristic concentrations of sodium in model organisms are: 10 mM in E. coli, 30 mM in budding yeast, 10 mM in mammalian cell and 100 mM in blood plasma.

Sodium distribution in species

Humans
The minimum physiological requirement for sodium is between 115 and 500 mg per day depending on sweating due to physical activity, and whether the person is adapted to the climate.  Sodium chloride is the principal source of sodium in the diet, and is used as seasoning and preservative, such as for pickling and jerky; most of it comes from processed foods. The Adequate Intake for sodium is 1.2 to 1.5 g per day, but on average people in the United States consume  3.4 g per day, the minimum amount that promotes hypertension. Note that salt contains about 39.3% sodium by massthe rest being chlorine and other trace chemicals; thus the Tolerable Upper Intake Level of 2.3 g sodium would be about 5.9 g of salt—about 1 teaspoon. The average daily excretion of sodium is between 40 and 220 mEq.

Normal serum sodium levels are between approximately 135 and 145 mEq/L (135 to 145 mmol/L). A serum sodium level of less than 135 mEq/L qualifies as hyponatremia, which is considered severe when the serum sodium level is below 125 mEq/L.

The renin–angiotensin system and the atrial natriuretic peptide indirectly regulate the amount of signal transduction in the human central nervous system, which depends on sodium ion motion across the nerve cell membrane, in all nerves. Sodium is thus important in neuron function and osmoregulation between cells and the extracellular fluid; the distribution of sodium ions are mediated in all animals by sodium–potassium pumps, which are active transporter solute pumps, pumping ions against the gradient, and sodium-potassium channels. Sodium channels are known to be less selective in comparison to potassium channels. Sodium is the most prominent cation in extracellular fluid: in the 15 L of extracellular fluid in a 70 kg human there is around 50 grams of sodium, 90% of the body's total sodium content.

Some potent neurotoxins, such as batrachotoxin, increase the sodium ion permeability of the cell membranes in nerves and muscles, causing a massive and irreversible depolarization of the membranes with potentially fatal consequences. However, drugs with smaller effects on sodium ion motion in nerves may have diverse pharmacological effects that range from anti-depressant to anti-seizure actions.

Other animals
Since only some plants need sodium and those in small quantities, a completely plant-based diet will generally be very low in sodium. This requires some herbivores to obtain their sodium from salt licks and other mineral sources. The animal need for sodium is probably the reason for the highly conserved ability to taste the sodium ion as "salty." Receptors for the pure salty taste respond best to sodium; otherwise, the receptors respond only to a few other small monovalent cations (and somewhat to ). The calcium ion (Ca2+) also tastes salty and sometimes bitter to some people but, like potassium, can trigger other tastes.

Sodium ions play a diverse and important role in many physiological processes, acting to regulate blood volume, blood pressure, osmotic equilibrium and pH.

Plants 

In C4 plants, sodium is a micronutrient that aids in metabolism, specifically in regeneration of phosphoenolpyruvate (involved in the biosynthesis of various aromatic compounds, and in carbon fixation) and synthesis of chlorophyll. In others, it substitutes for potassium in several roles, such as maintaining turgor pressure and aiding in the opening and closing of stomata. Excess sodium in the soil limits the uptake of water due to decreased water potential, which may result in wilting; similar concentrations in the cytoplasm can lead to enzyme inhibition, which in turn causes necrosis and chlorosis. To avoid these problems, plants developed mechanisms that limit sodium uptake by roots, store them in cell vacuoles, and control them over long distances; excess sodium may also be stored in old plant tissue, limiting the damage to new growth. Though much how excess sodium loading in the xylem is yet to be determined. However, anti porter CHX21 can be attributed to active loading of sodium into the xylem.

Function of sodium ions 

Sodium is the primary cation (positively charged ion) in extracellular fluids in animals and humans. These fluids, such as blood plasma and extracellular fluids in other tissues, bathe cells and carry out transport functions for nutrients and wastes. Sodium is also the principal cation in seawater, although the concentration there is about 3.8 times what it is normally in extracellular body fluids.

Human water and salt balance 

Although the system for maintaining optimal salt and water balance in the body is a complex one, one of the primary ways in which the human body keeps track of loss of body water is that osmoreceptors in the hypothalamus sense a balance of sodium and water concentration in extracellular fluids. Relative loss of body water will cause sodium concentration to rise higher than normal, a condition known as hypernatremia. This ordinarily results in thirst. Conversely, an excess of body water caused by drinking will result in too little sodium in the blood (hyponatremia), a condition which is again sensed by the hypothalamus, causing a decrease in vasopressin hormone secretion from the posterior pituitary, and a consequent loss of water in the urine, which acts to restore blood sodium concentrations to normal.

Severely dehydrated persons, such as people rescued from ocean or desert survival situations, usually have very high blood sodium concentrations. These must be very carefully and slowly returned to normal, since too-rapid correction of hypernatremia may result in brain damage from cellular swelling, as water moves suddenly into cells with high osmolar content.     
   
In humans, a high-salt intake was demonstrated to attenuate nitric oxide production. Nitric oxide (NO) contributes to vessel homeostasis by inhibiting vascular smooth muscle contraction and growth, platelet aggregation, and leukocyte adhesion to the endothelium.

Urinary sodium
Because the hypothalamus/osmoreceptor system ordinarily works well to cause drinking or urination to restore the body's sodium concentrations to normal, this system can be used in medical treatment to regulate the body's total fluid content, by first controlling the body's sodium content. Thus, when a powerful diuretic drug is given which causes the kidneys to excrete sodium, the effect is accompanied by an excretion of body water (water loss accompanies sodium loss). This happens because the kidney is unable to efficiently retain water while excreting large amounts of sodium. In addition, after sodium excretion, the osmoreceptor system may sense lowered sodium concentration in the blood and then direct compensatory urinary water loss in order to correct the hyponatremic (low blood sodium) state.

See also 
 Biology and pharmacology of chemical elements

References

External links
 Brooks/Cole publishers – Sodium Potassium pump
 Oregon State University – Micronutrient Information Center

Biological systems
Biology and pharmacology of chemical elements
Dietary minerals
Nutrition
Serology
Biology